Bob Priestley may refer to:

 Robert Priestley (1901–1986), American set decorator
 Bob Priestley (American football) (1920–2015), American football end